The Electronics Technology and Devices Laboratory (ETDL) was a research institution located at Fort Monmouth, New Jersey that served as the U.S. Army's central laboratory for electronics research from 1971 to 1992. ETDL was one of the seven Army laboratories that merged to form the U.S. Army Research Laboratory (ARL).

History 
The Electronics Technology and Devices Laboratory was one of the many laboratories that materialized following the dissolution of the Signal Corps Laboratories (SCL). Throughout its history, the SCL was given various different names as it underwent numerous restructuring efforts by the U.S. Army. By the early 1950s, the SCL was known as the Signal Corps Engineering Laboratories before it was redesignated as the U.S. Army Signal Corps Research and Development Laboratory (ASCRDL) in 1958. That same year, the Institute for Exploratory Research was created to consolidate the ASCRDL's internal research efforts.

In 1962, a major Army restructuring program caused the ASCRDL to become a subordinate element of the U.S. Army Electronics Command (ECOM) known as the U.S. Army Electronics Research and Development Laboratory. The lab was again renamed to the U.S. Army Electronics Laboratories in 1964 only to completely dissolve during the Army reorganization of 1965. The U.S. Army Electronics Laboratories were then reorganized into six different laboratories following their discontinuation: the Electronic Components Laboratory, the Communications/ADP Laboratory, the Atmospheric Sciences Laboratory, the Electronic Warfare Laboratory (part of which later became the Vulnerability Assessment Laboratory), the Avionics Laboratory, and the Combat Surveillance and Target Acquisition Laboratory. In 1971, the Electronic Components Laboratory merged with the Institute for Exploratory Research to form the Electronics Technology and Devices Laboratory, which became situated at the Albert J. Myer Center at Fort Monmouth, New Jersey.

ETDL was awarded the distinction of “Army Laboratory of the Year” in 1980 and 1984 as well as “Army Laboratory of Excellence” in 1981 and 1984. By 1985, it consisted of more than 300 personnel and had an annual budget of $76.6 million with approximately $31 million worth of lab equipment. In 1990, the lab received the Defense Standardization Program's Organizational Achievement Award, which recognized improvements in interoperability, cost reduction, quality, reliability, and readiness through standardization.

In 1992, ETDL was transferred from Fort Monmouth to the U.S. Army Research Laboratory as a result of the Base Realignment and Closure in 1988. This arrangement was part of a $115 million project dedicated to consolidating four additional Army laboratory elements into ARL as one unified organization. Under ARL, ETDL became the Electronics and Power Sources Directorate, which eventually became part of the Sensors and Electron Devices Directorate in 1996.

Research 
During its time frame from 1971 to 1992, ETDL was responsible for developing electronic technologies and devices for next-generation Army systems, which involved extensive research in areas such as millimeter waves, microwaves, microelectronics, analog signal processing, and frequency control. In order to properly delegate these tasks, the laboratory operated under five divisions: Electronic Materials, Power Sources, Industrial Engineering and Development, Microelectronics and Displays, and Microwave and Signal Processing Devices. ETDL generally prioritized furthering technologies related to millimeter wave devices, pulsars, wide-band jamming devices, navigation devices, interactive tactical operation displays, lithium and rechargeable batteries, photonic devices, flat panel displays, acoustic wave devices, and high-speed signal-processing devices. In addition, extensive emphasis was placed on developing new materials for electronic applications.

ETDL was heavily involved in semiconductor research and investigated the properties of various metallic alloys and solvents for enhancing the longevity, performance, and yield of electronic devices. The lab also performed research on a wide range of electronic and high power applications. It championed the first automatic assembly of printed circuit boards and the first ultra-stable crystal oscillators for secure radios, stable airborne radars, and Identification Friend or Foe (IFF) systems. It provided one of the highest energy product temperature-stable magnetic materials for high-power microwave tubes. ETDL was also the first to manufacture several electronic systems in the United States, such as high-power lithium rechargeable batteries and quantum-dimensioned microwave frequency sources, along with new developments in surface acoustic delay lines, pulse compressors, and filters for radar systems.

In the late 1970s, ETDL was among the first labs in the U.S. Department of Defense to participate in the development of Very High Speed Integrated Circuits (VHSIC), which facilitated the production of high-speed, high-density, and low-power computer chips and microprocessors. During the DoD's VHSIC Program that took place in the 1980s, ETDL was tasked with conducting functional and parametric electrical tests on VHSIC devices. In addition, the lab played an instrumental role in the Microwave/Millimeter Wave Monolithic Integrated Circuit (MIMIC) program, serving as one of the lead laboratories.

ETDL also conducted research on electrothermal-chemical gun technology starting in the mid-1980s to increase the power and muzzle energy of tanks and other artillery systems. Starting in 1989, ETDL made many major improvements to the M1 Abrams tank by significantly enhancing its power capabilities and mobility with all-wheel drive, integrating electric drives and actuators in its electrical power system, and increasing voltage handling capabilities with gate turn-off thyristors. Other projects included the development of thin film electroluminescent display devices, rare-earth permanent magnets, and variable temperature magnetometers.

Collaborations 
In 1986, the U.S. government passed the Federal Technology Transfer Act of 1986 to gradually disseminate technology developed by federal government agencies to the commercial sector. In cooperation with the Federal Technology Transfer Act, ETDL established several Cooperative Research and Development Agreements (CRDAs) to collaborate with members of industry and academia in electronic device research. By 1989, ETDL assembled a formal CRDA in the following areas of research: microelectronics, millimeter wave signal processing, high power semiconductor devices development, magnesium dioxide battery development, high frequency oscillators, magnetic circuit designs for nuclear magnetic resonance imaging, and amplifiers for military radar and civilian applications, and solid state materials. Those participating in these CRDAs involved two or more of the following companies and academic institutions: GTE Corporation, New York University School of Medicine, Rayovac Corporation (now Spectrum Brands), University of Virginia, Research Triangle Institute, American Cyanamid Company, Polytechnic University, Electromagnetic Sciences Inc., and the Electric Power Research Institute. Concurrently, ETDL, along with the National Science Foundation, also established several Memoranda of Understanding with five different universities to form a consortium dedicated to high speed microelectronics and millimeter-wave communication research. These five selected universities were Pennsylvania State University, Clarkson State University, University of Maryland, University of Virginia, and Brooklyn College. Each university received a $30,000 grant to have students engage in research at ETDL for an average of two weeks per month.

See also 

 Atmospheric Sciences Laboratory
 Vulnerability Assessment Laboratory
 Signal Corps Laboratories
 Fort Monmouth

References 

Research installations of the United States Army
Military technology